Ithaka Maria Harito (born Gyrcelea-Ithaka-Maria Pruuli in Tallinn on 21 June 1979; former surname Rahula) is an Estonian singer and songwriter.

She has been studied in Georg Ots Tallinn Music College (1994-1996) and in Estonian Academy of Music and Theatre.

She has been a member in bands Best B4 (1996-1997) and Slobodan River (2000-2006).

She has been the host for the television series Eesti otsib superstaari.

References

1979 births
Living people
21st-century Estonian women singers
Estonian pop singers
Estonian television presenters
Estonian Academy of Music and Theatre alumni
Singers from Tallinn
Tallinn Georg Ots Music School alumni
20th-century Estonian women singers